The Battle of Peralta was a minor engagement near the end of Confederate General Henry Hopkins Sibley's 1862  New Mexico Campaign.

Battle
Retreating after the Battle of Glorieta Pass, Confederate troops of the 5th Texas Mounted Volunteers under Colonel Thomas Green camped in the town of Peralta, New Mexico Territory and planned to cross a series of irrigation canals the next day. The rest of the Confederate army was encamped on the other side of the Rio Grande in the town of Los Lunas.

On April 14 the pursuing Union Army forces under Colonel Edward Canby caught up with Green. At dawn, Union cavalry attacked and captured the Confederate wagon train, killing and capturing the guard. The Confederates used the low adobe houses in the town as natural fortifications. Canby captured a Confederate supply train which was then approaching Peralta, and then sent John Chivington and Gabriel R. Paul to surround the Confederates to prevent any forces from reaching Green. The adobe walls and irrigation ditches surrounding the town were stronger than Canby was willing to risk an assault on. Learning of the fighting, Sibley led the 4th and 7th Texas Mounted Rifles across the river. The rival armies battered each other in an artillery duel, until a dust storm blew in and allowed the Confederates to withdraw to the west bank of the Rio Grande, leaving behind a town which had been reduced to rubble.

The Confederates reached Los Lunas at 4 a.m., where they rested for a few hours before continuing their retreat. Canby followed with the Union army, harassing the Confederate column with cavalry.

References

Eicher, John H., & Eicher, David J.: Civil War High Commands, Stanford University Press, 2001, .
Heyman, Max L., Jr.: Prudent Soldier: A Biography of Major General ERS Canby, 1817-1873, Frontier Military Series III, Glendale, CA: The Arthur H. Clark Co., 1959.
Filson Historical Society Library: MS #118. "Canby, Edward Richard Sprigg, 1819[sic]-1873. Papers, 1837-1873." A\C214 (1 box, 146 items; includes contemporary newspaper accounts regarding General Canby's death and its aftermath).
Military biography of Henry Hopkins Sibley from the Cullum biographies
www.sangres.com/history/civilwarnm.htm
 Frazier, Donald S. Blood & Treasure: Confederate Empire in the Southwest.' Texas A&M University Press; College Station, Texas, 1995. 

Peralta
Peralta
Peralta
Peralta
History of Valencia County, New Mexico
April 1862 events